Cheriton is a town in Northampton County, Virginia, United States. The population was 487 at the 2010 census.

History
Eyre Hall was listed on the National Register of Historic Places in 1969. It was designated a National Historic Landmark on March 2, 2012.

Geography
Cheriton is located at  (37.289443, −75.968201).  It is situated along U.S. Route 13 at its junction with State Route 184.

According to the United States Census Bureau, the town has a total area of 1.0 square miles (2.7 km), of which, 1.0 square miles (2.7 km) of it is land and 0.96% is water.

Demographics

At the 2000 census there were 499 people, 219 households, and 134 families living in the town. The population density was 485.8 people per square mile (187.1/km). There were 239 housing units at an average density of 232.7 per square mile (89.6/km).  The racial makeup of the town was 71.14% White, 27.45% African American, 1.00% from other races, and 0.40% from two or more races. Hispanic or Latino of any race were 1.60%.

Of the 219 households 22.4% had children under the age of 18 living with them, 45.7% were married couples living together, 11.9% had a female householder with no husband present, and 38.4% were non-families. 36.1% of households were one person and 21.0% were one person aged 65 or older. The average household size was 2.28 and the average family size was 2.90.

The age distribution was 21.8% under the age of 18, 4.6% from 18 to 24, 24.6% from 25 to 44, 25.3% from 45 to 64, and 23.6% 65 or older. The median age was 44 years. For every 100 females, there were 79.5 males. For every 100 females age 18 and over, there were 83.1 males.

The median household income was $26,429 and the median family income  was $39,028. Males had a median income of $22,222 versus $16,818 for females. The per capita income for the town was $14,238. About 7.8% of families and 11.9% of the population were below the poverty line, including 8.8% of those under age 18 and 19.5% of those age 65 or over.

Notable people
Mignon Holland Anderson, author, born in Cheriton.
Henry Wise Jr., Tuskegee Airman and physician, born in Cheriton.

Climate
The climate in this area is characterized by hot, humid summers and generally mild to cool winters.  According to the Köppen Climate Classification system, Cheriton has a humid subtropical climate, abbreviated "Cfa" on climate maps.

References

Towns in Northampton County, Virginia
Towns in Virginia